And Your Sister? (French: Et ta soeur?) is a 1958 French comedy film directed by Maurice Delbez and starring Pierre Fresnay, Arletty and Jean-Claude Brialy.

Cast
 Pierre Fresnay as Bastien du Boccage
 Arletty as Lucrèce du Boccage
 Jean-Claude Brialy as Bruno Puymartin
 Sophie Grimaldi as Francine du Boccage
 Jacques Dufilho as Puymartin, l'auteur	
 Jean Tissier as Le directeur de la prison
 Annie Fratellini as Jeannette
 Pierre Destailles as Le directeur du journal
 Jean-Pierre Cassel as  L'ami du fiancé
 René Bergeron as Le contrôleur du train
 Christian Brocard as  Un machiniste T.V
 René Hell as Julien le concierge
 Jean-Jacques Steen as Le brigadier

References

Bibliography 
 Parish, James Robert. Film Actors Guide: Western Europe. Scarecrow Press, 1977.

External links 
 

1958 films
1958 comedy films
French comedy films
French black-and-white films
1950s French-language films
Films directed by Maurice Delbez
Gaumont Film Company films
Films with screenplays by Roland Laudenbach
1950s French films